William Minor (born December 2, 1969) is an American poet. His first book, tree on the outside, was published by Coracle in 2010, followed by pigeons and pussy (Shearsman, 2013), The Balthus Poems (Coracle, 2018), and Pieces in the Form of a Pear (Black Centipede Press, 2020). Other poems have appeared in ditch, Dusie, DIAGRAM, 
Coconut and 6x6, among others.  He lives in Los Angeles.

Poems online
 Selections from pigeons and pussy (via Shearsman)
 Further excerpts from pigeons and pussy (via Ditch)
 5 poems (via Poetry Pacific)

References

External links
 Review of tree on the outside
 Website

1969 births
Living people
21st-century American poets